Aleksei Leontievich Kovalev (born 10 May 1925 – died 7 September 1997) was the Red Army soldier who assisted in the taking of the photograph Raising a Flag over the Reichstag.

Biography

Aleksei Kovalev was born in the village of Burlin, Kazakh SSR, son of the farmer of Russian nationality. After high school, he worked in the kolkhoz. He was drafted into the Red Army in 1944.

Reichstag photograph
When Yevgeny Khaldei reached the Reichstag after its pacification, Khaldei found that a number of Soviet flags had already been planted there. Allegedly, when he asked who had first raised the Soviet flag over the building, the soldiers present singled out Kovalev, Abdulkhakim Ismailov, and Leonid Gorychev. Khaldei produced a flag of his own and asked the men to help him to the roof. Kovalev attached the flag used in Raising a Flag over the Reichstag.

Kovalev was demobilized in 1950 and joined the Kiev Fire Department the next year. In 1958, he joined the Communist Party of the Soviet Union. Kovalev retired as a Lieutenant Colonel in 1988 and died on 7 September 1997 in Kyiv. He is buried in the city at the Baikove Cemetery.

Awards and decorations
On 15 May 1946, Kovalev was awarded the Order of Glory, 1st Degree. He was member #1204 of the order.

See also
 Ira Hayes, one of the US Marines in the photograph Raising the Flag on Iwo Jima

Citations

1925 births
1997 deaths
Military personnel from Kyiv
Soviet people of World War II
Recipients of the Order of Glory
People notable for being the subject of a specific photograph
Battle of Berlin
Burials at Baikove Cemetery